"There Goes the Fear" is the first single released from English alternative rock band Doves' second studio album, The Last Broadcast (2002). The single was released on 15 April 2002 in the UK on CD and 10-inch vinyl and charted at number three on the UK Singles Chart. Both formats were released and deleted on the same day. A single was also released for the song in the Netherlands and Australia, featuring two live B-sides. In October 2011, NME placed the song at number 137 on its list "150 Best Tracks of the Past 15 Years".

Background
When asked in a 2010 interview with Under the Radar as to why the single was released and deleted on the same day, Jez Williams stated, "It was to do something different from the norm. Just wanted to try something different really. I can't remember exactly whose idea it was. It might have been the manager's, but we were kind of into it. A kind of statement, in a way. We liked the fact that you could only get a hold of a certain amount of this or a certain amount of that. Especially in this day and age of readily available bits of music, it's kind of nice: a physical copy that's precious to you because you managed to get to the shop that day and actually own that."

B-side "Hit the Ground Running" is an adaptation of "Werewolves of London," written by Warren Zevon, Leroy Marinell, and Robert "Waddy" Wachtel.

Music video
The music video for "There Goes the Fear," which was constructed entirely out of existing footage and won a D&AD award in 2003 for Outstanding Direction, was directed by Julian House and Julian Gibbs. The video was also included on the UK CD single release.

Track listings

Charts

Weekly charts

Year-end charts

Release history

References

2002 singles
British progressive rock songs
Doves (band) songs
Heavenly Recordings singles
Songs written by Andy Williams (Doves)
Songs written by Jez Williams
Songs written by Jimi Goodwin